Population pressure, a term summarizing the stress brought about by an excessive population density and its consequences, is used both in conjunction with human overpopulation and with other animal populations that suffer from too many individuals per area (or volume in the case of aquatic organisms). In the case of humans, absolute numbers of individuals may lead to population pressure, but the same is true for overexploitation and overconsumption of available resources and ensuing environmental degradation by otherwise-normal population densities. Similarly, when the carrying capacity of the environment goes down, unchanged population numbers may prove too high and again produce significant pressure.

"Pressure" is to be understood metaphorically and hints at the analogy between a gas or fluid that under pressure will tend to escape a bounded container. Similarly, "population pressure" in animal populations in general usually leads to migration activity, and in humans, it may additionally cause land loss because of land conversion of previously-uninhabited areas and development. When no space for evading the pressure is available, another severe consequence can be the reduction or even extinction of the population under pressure.

Based on ideas by Thomas Malthus as laid out in An Essay on the Principle of Population, Charles Darwin theorized that population pressure must generate a struggle for existence in which many individuals die, and better-adapted variants are more likely to survive and to reproduce.

See also
Malthusian catastrophe
Population growth
Overshoot (population)
Sustainable population

External links

References

Population ecology